Ian James Brooks (21 April 1928 – 20 April 2022) was a New Zealand politician of the Labour Party.

Early life and career
Brooks was born in Blenheim on 21 April 1928, the son of Ernest Brooks, and was educated at Marlborough College. He worked in the grocery trade for eight years and was then a senior clerk at the New Zealand Post Office for twenty years. He was a part-time farmer, and his 1940s Allis-Chalmers model C tractor is on display at Marlborough Museum.

In 1954, he married Lowis Rita Terrill, the daughter of Leonard Terrill. They had two sons and two daughters.

Political career

After Shand's death only days after the general election, Brooks had a decisive win against Shand's son in the resulting by-election in February  turning a 2500 vote loss from three months earlier into an 1100 vote winning margin. The Police once urged him to cancel an electorate meeting in Hanmer Springs as they had received a death threat against him over his opposition to the Vietnam War.

He stood once more in the Marlborough electorate in the  but was narrowly defeated by National's Doug Kidd.

Life after politics
In his spare time, Brooks grew bulbs. His parents were in The Salvation Army and Brooks joined them as a child, and remained an active member in Blenheim, playing the bass saxhorn in the Salvation Army band. Brooks was widowed by the death of his wife, Lowis, in 2016. He died on 20 April 2022 at Wairau Hospital in Blenheim, the day before his 94th birthday.

References

External links
Wedding photo hosted by Marlborough Museum

1928 births
2022 deaths
New Zealand Labour Party MPs
Unsuccessful candidates in the 1975 New Zealand general election
Unsuccessful candidates in the 1969 New Zealand general election
Members of the New Zealand House of Representatives
New Zealand MPs for South Island electorates
People educated at Marlborough Boys' College